The enzyme L-2-amino-4-chloropent-4-enoate dehydrochlorinase (EC 4.5.1.4) catalyzes the reaction

L-2-amino-4-chloropent-4-enoate + H2O  2-oxopent-4-enoate + chloride + NH3

This enzyme belongs to the family of lyases, specifically the class of carbon-halide lyases.  The systematic name of this enzyme class is L-2-amino-4-chloropent-4-enoate chloride-lyase (adding water; deaminating; 2-oxopent-4-enoate-forming). Other names in common use include L-2-amino-4-chloro-4-pentenoate dehalogenase, and L-2-amino-4-chloropent-4-enoate chloride-lyase (deaminating).

References

 

EC 4.5.1
Enzymes of unknown structure